Sir James Colquhoun, 4th Baronet, of Luss (7 February 1804 – 18 December 1873) was the Member of Parliament (MP) for Dumbartonshire from  1837 to 1841. He drowned in 1873 when he and others rowed out to bring back a deer for a Christmas feast. He and all aboard the boat were lost off Inch Lonaig during a sudden storm. In his memory his son, also James, had the church rebuilt.

References 

1804 births
1873 deaths
Baronets in the Baronetage of Great Britain
Members of the Parliament of the United Kingdom for Scottish constituencies
UK MPs 1837–1841
Lord-Lieutenants of Dunbartonshire
Deaths by drowning in the United Kingdom